Kari Martonen (born 13 March 1963) is a Finnish football manager and former player. He also works as an assistant manager of the Finland U21 squad.

As a player, he played in total of 248 matches and scored 22 goals for HJK and FC Haka.  After retiring as a player, he started working as a youth coach at his former club Haka and soon became the assistant manager under Olli Huttunen. In 2006, he became the assistant manager under Mika Lehkosuo at FC Honka.

In November 2009 as Ville Priha was sacked from JJK, Martonen took over as a head coach, signing a three-year contract with JJK.

Honours

As player
Mestaruussarja: 1985, 1987, 1988
Veikkausliiga: 1995
Finnish Cup: 1982

As coach

Veikkausliiga: 2004
Finnish Cup: 2002
 Coach of the Month: April 2010

References

1963 births
Living people
Finnish footballers
FC Haka players
Helsingin Jalkapalloklubi players
Veikkausliiga players
Finnish football managers
Association football defenders
People from Valkeakoski
Sportspeople from Pirkanmaa